Mouhotia is a genus of beetles in the family Carabidae, containing the following species:

 Mouhotia batesi G. Lewis, 1879
 Mouhotia convexa G. Lewis, 1883
 Mouhotia gloriosa Laporte, 1862

References

Scaritinae